Fernholm is a Swedish surname. Notable people with the surname include:

Daniel Fernholm (born 1983), Swedish ice hockey player 
Simon Fernholm (born 1994), Swedish ice hockey player
Stefan Fernholm (1959–1997), Swedish discus thrower and shot putter

See also
Gudrun Slettengren-Fernholm

Swedish-language surnames